Mypadu Beach is located on the East coast of Bay of Bengal, at a distance of  from SPSR Nellore district in Andhra Pradesh. The beach is maintained by the state tourism board, APTDC. The beach provides fishing opportunities for the local fishermen, and access to cruises for the tourists.
The Andhra Pradesh Tourism Development Corporation (APTDC), is taking certain measures to promote Mypadu Beach as a tourist destination by setting up recreational activities such as water sports and development of resorts.

See also 
List of beaches in India

References 

Beaches of Andhra Pradesh
Geography of Nellore district